The 2017 Scottish Open was the 45th edition of the Scottish Open. Cameron Menzies won the men's tournament whilst Fallon Sherrock won the women's. Menzies was the first Scottish player to win the open since 2007, when Gary Anderson won. All four semi-finalists in the men's tournament were below 50th in the BDO darts rankings. In the women's tournament it was Sherrock's first victory since the Finder Masters 2015.

Prize money
Winner £3,000 (men), £1,000 (women)
Runner-up £1,500 (men), £450 (women)
Semi-finalist £480 (men), £160 (women)
Quarter-finalist £200 (men), £70 (women)
Last 16 £80 (men), £40 (women)
Last 32 £40 (men)

Last 32 - Men's Draw

Women's Draw

References

Darts in Scotland
Scottish Open
Scottish Open darts